Podklanc is a settlement on the left bank of the Meža River south of Dravograd in the Carinthia region in northern Slovenia.

References

External links
Podklanc on Geopedia

Populated places in the Municipality of Dravograd